The Proclamation of Independence of Morocco, also translated as the Manifesto of Independence of Morocco or Proclamation of January 11, 1944, is a document in which Moroccan nationalists called for the independence of Morocco in its national entirety under Muhammad V Bin Yusuf, as well as the installment of a democratic, constitutional government to guarantee the rights of all segments of society. January 11 is an official government holiday in Morocco.

Context 
On November 8, 1942, Allied forces landed in Morocco—French protectorate in Morocco since the 1912 Treaty of Fes—during Operation Torch. Free France then retook control of the largely collaborationist colonial administration sympathetic to Philippe Pétain, which boded well for Moroccan nationalists.

Sultan Muhammad V of Morocco, who was a de facto prisoner of the colonial administration, though he had made no public gesture of sympathy toward Nazi Germany, and had protected Moroccan Jews from antisemitic policies, received confirmation from President Franklin D. Roosevelt at the Casablanca Conference of January 1943, that the US would support the independence of Morocco when the war was over.

On December 18, 1943, those who were still free among the old guard of the National Party outlawed by the French administration in 1937—whose previous leaders such as Allal al-Fassi, Muhammad Hassan el-Wazzani, et al. were either in prison or in exile—organized a secret conference in Rabat to found the Istiqlal Party.

The Proclamation of Independence of Morocco was originally drafted by Ahmed el Hamiani Khatat and Ahmed Bahnini, attorneys of the party, and revised and amended by their colleagues.

On January 11, 1944, with the outcome of World War II still uncertain to all but the most perceptive, 66 Moroccans signed the public proclamation demanding an end to colonialism and the reinstatement of Morocco's independence, an enormous risk at the time.

The main nationalist leaders of all origins united around the Proclamation of Independence, forming a real political movement, representative of a wider segment of Moroccan society, urban and rural. They decided together to ally themselves with Sultan Muhammad V, to whom they submitted their demand.

Among the signatories were members of the resistance, symbols of a free Morocco, and people who would become key figures in the construction of the new Morocco.

Text 
Text of the Proclamation of Independence of January 11 presented to Sultan Muhammad V:

Signatories

Consequences 
The reaction was immediate: great pressure upon Sultan Muhammad V to publicly condemn the Proclamation, as well as the detention of signatories and known nationalist activists.

On the night of January 28, Ahmed Balafrej, secretary general of the Istiqlal Party, as well as his associate Mohamed Lyazidi, were arrested in Rabat under the pretext of sharing intelligence with Axis powers. Balafrej was one of 3 nationalist activists deported to Corsica. In Fes, Abdelaziz Bendriss and Hachemi Filali were incarcerated. In total, French authorities arrested 20 nationalist activists in the aftermath of this manifesto.

The Proclamation of Independence was a major step in the struggle for independence. It was with this document that the Moroccan Nationalist Movement allied itself with the sultan. The sultan also started to become an important national folk symbol, delivering the symbolic Tangier speech April 10, 1947 and being forced exile on the eve of Eid al-Adha August 20, 1953. The French Protectorate in Morocco came to an end on March 2, 1956 with the Franco-Moroccan Joint Declaration signed in Rabat.

See also 
 French Protectorate in Morocco
 Manifesto
 History of Morocco

Bibliography 

 Charles-André Julien (préf. Annie Rey-Goldzeiguer), « Naissance de l'Istiqlal », dans L'Afrique du Nord en marche : Algérie-Tunisie-Maroc, 1880-1952, Paris, Omnibus, 2002 (1re éd. 1952, rev. et augm. en 1971), 499 p. (OCLC 644767406), p. 296-297
 
 Moulay Abdelhadi Alaoui, « Mohammed V et le mouvement de Libération nationale », dans Le Maroc et la France : 1912-1956 - Textes et documents à l'appui, Rabat, Fanigraph, 2007, 568 p. (OCLC 262650411, présentation en ligne), p. 86-135
 « La conférence d'Anfa et les “habits neufs” du sultan », dans Michel Abitbol, Histoire du Maroc, Paris, Perrin, 2009 [détail de l’édition], p. 497-502
  [chapeau en ligne]
  Voici à quoi fait référence Bouaziz lorsqu'il écrit,  intitulée  .
  [premières lignes]

References 

November 1944 events
1944 in Morocco
1944 documents
Political manifestos
History of Morocco
Documents of Morocco